The 1978 Michigan Wolverines baseball team represented the University of Michigan in the 1978 NCAA Division I baseball season. The head coach was Moby Benedict, serving his 16th year. The Wolverines finished the season in 5th place in the 1978 College World Series.

Roster

Schedule 

! style="" | Regular Season
|- valign="top" 

|- align="center" bgcolor="#ccffcc"
| 1 || March 4 || vs  || Unknown • Unknown || 9–2 || 1–0 || 0–0
|- align="center" bgcolor="#ffcccc"
| 2 || March 5 || vs  || Unknown • Unknown || 2–11 || 1–1 || 0–0
|- align="center" bgcolor="#ccffcc"
| 3 || March 5 || vs Iowa State || Unknown • Unknown || 7–3 || 2–1 || 0–0
|- align="center" bgcolor="#ffcccc"
| 4 || March 6 || vs  || Unknown • Unknown || 1–3 || 2–2 || 0–0
|- align="center" bgcolor="#ccffcc"
| 5 || March 7 || vs Missouri || Unknown • Unknown || 6–4 || 3–2 || 0–0
|- align="center" bgcolor="#ccffcc"
| 6 || March 7 || at  || Red McEwen Field • Tampa, Florida || 3–2 || 4–2 || 0–0
|- align="center" bgcolor="#ffcccc"
| 7 || March 8 || vs  || Joker Marchant Stadium • Lakeland, Florida || 1–8 || 4–3 || 0–0
|- align="center" bgcolor="#ffcccc"
| 8 || March 10 || vs  || Unknown • Unknown || 8–9 || 4–4 || 0–0
|- align="center" bgcolor="#ffcccc"
| 9 || March 11 || vs Florida Southern || Unknown • Unknown || 7–8 || 4–5 || 0–0
|- align="center" bgcolor="#ccffcc"
| 10 || March 11 || vs Missouri || Unknown • Unknown || 8–5 || 5–5 || 0–0
|- align="center" bgcolor="#ccffcc"
| 11 || March 12 || vs Western Michigan || Unknown • Unknown || 7–3 || 6–5 || 0–0
|-

|- align="center" bgcolor="#ffcccc"
| 12 || April 7 || vs  || Unknown • Unknown || 1–5 || 6–6 || 0–0
|- align="center" bgcolor="#ccffcc"
| 13 || April 8 || vs Bowling Green || Unknown • Unknown || 4–1 || 7–6 || 0–0
|- align="center" bgcolor="#ffcccc"
| 14 || April 12 || vs  || Unknown • Unknown || 0–2 || 7–7 || 0–0
|- align="center" bgcolor="#ffcccc"
| 15 || April 12 || vs Detroit || Unknown • Unknown || 0–3 || 7–8 || 0–0
|- align="center" bgcolor="#ccffcc"
| 16 || April 15 || at  || Guy Lowman Field • Madison, Wisconsin || 5–1 || 8–8 || 1–0
|- align="center" bgcolor="#ccffcc"
| 17 || April 15 || at Wisconsin || Guy Lowman Field • Madison, Wisconsin || 6–4 || 9–8 || 2–0
|- align="center" bgcolor="#ccffcc"
| 18 || April 16 || at  || Bierman Field • Minneapolis, Minnesota || 3–2 || 10–8 || 3–0
|- align="center" bgcolor="#ccffcc"
| 19 || April 16 || at Minnesota || Bierman Field • Minneapolis, Minnesota || 13–7 || 11–8 || 4–0
|- align="center" bgcolor="#ffcccc"
| 20 || April 19 || vs Western Michigan || Unknown • Unknown || 2–3 || 11–9 || 4–0
|- align="center" bgcolor="#ccffcc"
| 21 || April 19 || vs Western Michigan || Unknown • Unknown || 5–3 || 12–9 || 4–0
|- align="center" bgcolor="#ccffcc"
| 22 || April 23 || vs  || Unknown • Unknown || 8–0 || 13–9 || 4–0
|- align="center" bgcolor="#ffcccc"
| 23 || April 23 || vs Eastern Michigan || Unknown • Unknown || 1–2 || 13–10 || 4–0
|- align="center" bgcolor="#ccffcc"
| 24 || April 29 ||  || Ray Fisher Stadium • Ann Arbor, Michigan || 10–0 || 14–10 || 5–0
|- align="center" bgcolor="#ccffcc"
| 25 || April 29 || Illinois || Ray Fisher Stadium • Ann Arbor, Michigan || 3–0 || 15–10 || 6–0
|- align="center" bgcolor="#ffcccc"
| 26 || April 30 ||  || Ray Fisher Stadium • Ann Arbor, Michigan || 2–4 || 15–11 || 6–1
|- align="center" bgcolor="#ccffcc"
| 27 || April 30 || Purdue || Ray Fisher Stadium • Ann Arbor, Michigan || 6–5 || 16–11 || 7–1
|-

|- align="center" bgcolor="#ccffcc"
| 28 || May 3 || at  || Unknown • Notre Dame, Indiana || 4–0 || 17–11 || 7–1
|- align="center" bgcolor="#ccffcc"
| 29 || May 3 || at Notre Dame || Unknown • Notre Dame, Indiana || 6–0 || 18–11 || 7–1
|- align="center" bgcolor="#ccffcc"
| 30 || May 6 ||  || Ray Fisher Stadium • Ann Arbor, Michigan || 9–1 || 19–11 || 8–1
|- align="center" bgcolor="#ccffcc"
| 31 || May 6 || Indiana || Ray Fisher Stadium • Ann Arbor, Michigan || 5–1 || 20–11 || 9–1
|- align="center" bgcolor="#ccffcc"
| 32 || May 7 ||  || Ray Fisher Stadium • Ann Arbor, Michigan || 4–2 || 21–11 || 10–1
|- align="center" bgcolor="#ccffcc"
| 33 || May 7 || Ohio State || Ray Fisher Stadium • Ann Arbor, Michigan || 12–1 || 22–11 || 11–1
|- align="center" bgcolor="#ccffcc"
| 34 || May 10 || vs Eastern Michigan || Unknown • Unknown || 3–2 || 23–11 || 11–1
|- align="center" bgcolor="#ccffcc"
| 35 || May 10 || vs Eastern Michigan || Unknown • Unknown || 5–4 || 24–11 || 11–1
|- align="center" bgcolor="#ccffcc"
| 36 || May 14 || vs  || Unknown • Unknown || 10–1 || 25–11 || 12–1
|- align="center" bgcolor="#ffcccc"
| 37 || May 14 || vs Iowa || Unknown • Unknown || 0–1 || 25–12 || 12–2
|- align="center" bgcolor="#ffcccc"
| 38 || May 17 || vs  || Unknown • Unknown || 2–4 || 25–13 || 12–2
|- align="center" bgcolor="#ffcccc"
| 39 || May 17 || vs Wayne State || Unknown • Unknown || 3–8 || 25–14 || 12–2
|- align="center" bgcolor="#ffcccc"
| 40 || May 20 || at  || John H. Kobs Field • East Lansing, Michigan || 5–10 || 25–15 || 12–3
|- align="center" bgcolor="#ccffcc"
| 41 || May 21 || Michigan State || Ray Fisher Stadium • Ann Arbor, Michigan || 3–0 || 26–15 || 13–3
|-

|-
|-
! style="" | Postseason
|- valign="top"

|- align="center" bgcolor="#ccffcc"
| 42 || May 26 ||  || Ray Fisher Stadium • Ann Arbor, Michigan || 8–1 || 27–15 || 13–3
|- align="center" bgcolor="#ccffcc"
| 43 || May 27 || Eastern Michigan || Ray Fisher Stadium • Ann Arbor, Michigan || 6–4 || 28–15 || 13–3
|- align="center" bgcolor="#ccffcc"
| 44 || May 28 || Texas A&M || Ray Fisher Stadium • Ann Arbor, Michigan || 3–0 || 29–15 || 13–3
|-

|- align="center" bgcolor="#ccffcc"
| 45 || June 2 || vs  || Johnny Rosenblatt Stadium • Omaha, Nebraska || 4–0 || 30–15 || 13–3
|- align="center" bgcolor="#ffcccc"
| 46 || June 4 || vs USC || Johnny Rosenblatt Stadium • Omaha, Nebraska || 3–11 || 30–16 || 13–3
|- align="center" bgcolor="#ffcccc"
| 47 || June 5 || vs North Carolina || Johnny Rosenblatt Stadium • Omaha, Nebraska || 6–7 || 30–17 || 13–3
|-

References 

Michigan Wolverines baseball seasons
Michigan Wolverines baseball
1978 Big Ten Conference baseball season
College World Series seasons
Big Ten Conference baseball champion seasons